The Convention Against Torture and Other Cruel, Inhuman or Degrading Treatment or Punishment (commonly known as the United Nations Convention Against Torture (UNCAT)) is an international human rights treaty under the review of the United Nations that aims to prevent torture and other acts of cruel, inhuman, or degrading treatment or punishment around the world.

The Convention requires member states to take effective measures to prevent torture in any territory under their jurisdiction, and forbids member states to transport people to any country where there is reason to believe they will be tortured.

The text of the convention was adopted by the United Nations General Assembly on 10 December 1984 and, following ratification by the 20th state party, it came into force on 26 June 1987. 26 June is now recognized as the International Day in Support of Victims of Torture, in honor of the convention. Since the convention's entry into force, the absolute prohibition against torture and other acts of cruel, inhuman, or degrading treatment or punishment has become accepted as a principle of customary international law. As of April 2022, the convention has 173 state parties.

Summary 
The Convention follows the structure of the Universal Declaration of Human Rights (UDHR), International Covenant on Civil and Political Rights (ICCPR) and the International Covenant on Economic, Social and Cultural Rights (ICESCR), with a preamble and 33 articles, divided into three parts:

Part I (Articles 1–16) contains a definition of torture (Article 1), and commits parties to taking effective measures to prevent any act of torture in any territory under their jurisdiction (Article 2). These include ensuring that torture is a criminal offense under a party's municipal law (Article 4), establishing jurisdiction over acts of torture committed by or against a party's nationals (Article 5), ensuring that torture is an extraditable offense (Article 8), and establishing universal jurisdiction to try cases of torture where an alleged torturer cannot be extradited (Article 5). Parties must promptly investigate any allegation of torture (Articles 12 and 13), and victims of torture, or their dependents in case victims died as a result of torture, must have an enforceable right to compensation (Article 14). Parties must also ban the use of evidence produced by torture in their courts (Article 15), and are barred from deporting, extraditing, or refouling people where there are substantial grounds for believing they will be tortured (Article 3). Parties are required to train and educate their public servants and private citizens involved in the custody, interrogation, or treatment of any individual subjected to any form of arrest, detention, or imprisonment, regarding the prohibition against torture (Article 10). Parties also must keep interrogation rules, instructions, methods, and practices under systematic review regarding individuals who are under custody or physical control in any territory under their jurisdiction, in order to prevent all acts of torture (Article 11). Parties are also obliged to prevent all acts of cruel, inhuman, or degrading treatment or punishment in any territory under their jurisdiction, and to investigate any allegation of such treatment. (Article 16).

Part II (Articles 17–24) governs reporting and monitoring of the convention and the steps taken by the parties to implement it. It establishes the Committee Against Torture (Article 17), and empowers it to investigate allegations of systematic torture (Article 20). It also establishes an optional dispute-resolution mechanism between parties (Article 21) and allows parties to recognize the competence of the committee to hear complaints from individuals about violations of the convention by a party (Article 22).

Part III (Articles 25–33) governs ratification, entry into force, and amendment of the convention. It also includes an optional arbitration mechanism for disputes between parties (Article 30).

Main provisions

Definition of torture 

Article 1.1 of the Convention defines torture as:

The words "inherent in or incidental to lawful sanctions" remain vague and very broad. It is extremely difficult to determine what sanctions are "inherent in or incidental to lawful sanctions" in a particular legal system and what are not. The drafters of the Convention neither provided any criteria for making such determination nor did it define the terms. The nature of the findings would so differ from one legal system to another that they would give rise to serious disputes among the parties to the convention. It was suggested that the reference to such rules would make the issue more complicated, for it would endow the rules with a semblance of legal binding force. This allows state parties to pass domestic laws that permit acts of torture that they believe are within the lawful sanctions clause. However, the most widely adopted interpretation of the lawful sanctions clause is that it refers to sanctions authorized by international law. Pursuant to this interpretation, only sanctions that are authorized by international law will fall within this exclusion. The interpretation of the lawful sanctions clause leaves no scope of application and is widely debated by authors, historians, and scholars alike.

Ban on torture 
Article 2 prohibits torture, and requires parties to take effective measures to prevent it in any territory under their jurisdiction. This prohibition is absolute and non-derogable. "No exceptional circumstances whatsoever" may be invoked to justify torture, including war, threat of war, internal political instability, public emergency, terrorist acts, violent crime, or any form of armed conflict. In other words, torture cannot be justified as a means to protect public safety or prevent emergencies. Subordinates who commit acts of torture cannot abstain themselves from legal responsibility on the grounds that they were just following orders from their superiors.

The prohibition on torture applies to anywhere under a party's effective jurisdiction inside or outside of its borders, whether on board its ships or aircraft or in its military occupations, military bases, peacekeeping operations, health care industries, schools, day care centers, detention centers, embassies, or any other of its areas, and protects all people under its effective control, regardless of nationality or how that control is exercised.

The other articles of part I lay out specific obligations intended to implement this absolute prohibition by preventing, investigating, and punishing acts of torture.

Ban on refoulement 

Article 3 prohibits parties from returning, extraditing, or refouling any person to a state "where there are substantial grounds for believing that he would be in danger of being subjected to torture." The Committee Against Torture has held that this danger must be assessed not just for the initial receiving state, but also to states to which the person may be subsequently expelled, returned or extradited.

Obligation to prosecute or extradite 
Article 7 obligates the government of the state in which the alleged offense occurred to either prosecute the accused party, or extradite them to a state that will, under the principle of aut dedere aut judicare.

Ban on cruel, inhuman, or degrading treatment or punishment 

Article 16 requires parties to prevent "other acts of cruel, inhuman or degrading treatment or punishment which do not amount to torture as defined in article 1" in any territory under their jurisdiction. Because it is often difficult to distinguish between cruel, inhuman, or degrading treatment or punishment and torture, the Committee regards Article 16's prohibition of such act as similarly absolute and non-derogable.

Signatories and ratifications 

As of 17 November 2021, there are 173 States parties. 22 UN Member States are not yet party to the convention.

Optional Protocol 

The Optional Protocol to the Convention Against Torture and Other Cruel, Inhuman or Degrading Treatment or Punishment (OPCAT), adopted by the General Assembly on 18 December 2002 and in force since 22 June 2006, provides for the establishment of "a system of regular visits undertaken by independent international and national bodies to places where people are deprived of their liberty, in order to prevent torture and other cruel, inhuman or degrading treatment or punishment," to be overseen by a Subcommittee on Prevention of Torture and Other Cruel, Inhuman or Degrading Treatment or Punishment.

As of April 2022, the Protocol has 76 signatories and 91 parties.

Committee Against Torture 

The Committee Against Torture (CAT) is a body of human rights experts that monitors implementation of the convention by State parties. The committee is one of eight UN-linked human rights treaty bodies. All state parties are obliged under the convention to submit regular reports to the CAT on how rights are being implemented. Upon ratifying the convention, states must submit a report within one year, after which they are obliged to report every four years. The Committee examines each report and addresses its concerns and recommendations to the State party in the form of "concluding observations". Under certain circumstances, the CAT may consider complaints or communications from individuals claiming that their rights under the Convention have been violated.

The CAT usually meets in April/May and November each year in Geneva. Members are elected to four-year terms by State parties and can be re-elected if nominated. The current membership of the CAT, :

Effects 
A 2021 study in the American Journal of Political Science found that countries that adopt national laws that prohibit torture (defining it in line with the standards codified in the UN Convention against Torture) subsequently experience reductions in police torture.

See also 

 Psychological torture
 European Convention for the Prevention of Torture and Inhuman or Degrading Treatment or Punishment
 International Day in Support of Victims of Torture
 International Rehabilitation Council for Torture Victims
 Use of torture since 1948
 World Organization Against Torture

References

Further reading

External links 

 Official text of the Convention
 List of parties
 Optional Protocol
 U.N. Committee against Torture
 Convention Against Torture Initiative
 Human Rights Watch summary of the Convention
 List of links to other related documents
 Human Rights First; Tortured Justice: Using Coerced Evidence to Prosecute Terrorist Suspects (2008)
 Human Rights First; Leave No Marks: Enhanced Interrogation Techniques and the Risk of Criminality
 International Rehabilitation Council for Torture Victims (IRCT); What is torture? Defining torture
 Introductory note by Hans Danelius, procedural history note and audiovisual material on the Convention against Torture and Other Cruel, Inhuman or Degrading Treatment or Punishment in the Historic Archives of the United Nations Audiovisual Library of International Law
 UN Convention Against Torture (1984–2014) – Research Guide, UNOG Library
 UN Convention Against Torture (1984–2014) – Bibliography (Books/Articles), UNOG Library

Decisions of the Committee Against Torture 
 Committee against Torture – Jurisprudence
 CAT decisions on OHCHR
 Decisions of the Committee Against Torture

Human rights instruments
Anti-torture treaties
United Nations treaties
Treaties concluded in 1984
Treaties entered into force in 1987
Treaties of the Democratic Republic of Afghanistan
Treaties of Albania
Treaties of Algeria
Treaties of Andorra
Treaties of Antigua and Barbuda
Treaties of Argentina
Treaties of Armenia
Treaties of Australia
Treaties of Austria
Treaties of Azerbaijan
Treaties of Bahrain
Treaties of Bangladesh
Treaties of the Byelorussian Soviet Socialist Republic
Treaties of Belgium
Treaties of Belize
Treaties of Benin
Treaties of Bolivia
Treaties of Bosnia and Herzegovina
Treaties of Botswana
Treaties of Brazil
Treaties of the People's Republic of Bulgaria
Treaties of Burkina Faso
Treaties of Burundi
Treaties of Cambodia
Treaties of Cameroon
Treaties of Canada
Treaties of Cape Verde
Treaties of the Central African Republic
Treaties of Chad
Treaties of Chile
Treaties of the People's Republic of China
Treaties of Colombia
Treaties of the Republic of the Congo
Treaties of Costa Rica
Treaties of Ivory Coast
Treaties of Croatia
Treaties of Cuba
Treaties of Cyprus
Treaties of Czechoslovakia
Treaties of the Czech Republic
Treaties of Zaire
Treaties of Denmark
Treaties of Djibouti
Treaties of the Dominican Republic
Treaties of Ecuador
Treaties of Egypt
Treaties of El Salvador
Treaties of Equatorial Guinea
Treaties of Eritrea
Treaties of Estonia
Treaties of Ethiopia
Treaties of Fiji
Treaties of Finland
Treaties of France
Treaties of Gabon
Treaties of the Gambia
Treaties of East Germany
Treaties of West Germany
Treaties of Georgia (country)
Treaties of Ghana
Treaties of Greece
Treaties of Guatemala
Treaties of Guinea
Treaties of Guinea-Bissau
Treaties of Guyana
Treaties of the Holy See
Treaties of Honduras
Treaties of the Hungarian People's Republic
Treaties of Iceland
Treaties of Indonesia
Treaties of Iraq
Treaties of Ireland
Treaties of Israel
Treaties of Italy
Treaties of Japan
Treaties of Jordan
Treaties of Kazakhstan
Treaties of Kenya
Treaties of Kuwait
Treaties of Kyrgyzstan
Treaties of Laos
Treaties of Latvia
Treaties of Lebanon
Treaties of Lesotho
Treaties of Liberia
Treaties of the Libyan Arab Jamahiriya
Treaties of Liechtenstein
Treaties of Lithuania
Treaties of Luxembourg
Treaties of Madagascar
Treaties of Malawi
Treaties of the Maldives
Treaties of Mali
Treaties of Malta
Treaties of Mauritania
Treaties of Mauritius
Treaties of Mexico
Treaties of Monaco
Treaties of Mongolia
Treaties of Montenegro
Treaties of Morocco
Treaties of Mozambique
Treaties of Namibia
Treaties of Nauru
Treaties of Nepal
Treaties of the Netherlands
Treaties of New Zealand
Treaties of Nicaragua
Treaties of Niger
Treaties of Nigeria
Treaties of Norway
Treaties of Oman
Treaties of Pakistan
Treaties of the State of Palestine
Treaties of Panama
Treaties of Paraguay
Treaties of Peru
Treaties of the Philippines
Treaties of the Polish People's Republic
Treaties of Portugal
Treaties of Qatar
Treaties of South Korea
Treaties of Moldova
Treaties of Romania
Treaties of the Soviet Union
Treaties of Rwanda
Treaties of San Marino
Treaties of Saudi Arabia
Treaties of Senegal
Treaties of Serbia and Montenegro
Treaties of Yugoslavia
Treaties of Seychelles
Treaties of Sierra Leone
Treaties of Slovakia
Treaties of Slovenia
Treaties of the Somali Democratic Republic
Treaties of South Africa
Treaties of South Sudan
Treaties of Spain
Treaties of Sri Lanka
Treaties of Sudan
Treaties of Suriname
Treaties of Saint Vincent and the Grenadines
Treaties of Eswatini
Treaties of Sweden
Treaties of Switzerland
Treaties of Syria
Treaties of Tajikistan
Treaties of Thailand
Treaties of North Macedonia
Treaties of East Timor
Treaties of Togo
Treaties of Tunisia
Treaties of Turkey
Treaties of Turkmenistan
Treaties of Uganda
Treaties of the Ukrainian Soviet Socialist Republic
Treaties of the United Arab Emirates
Treaties of the United Kingdom
Treaties of the United States
Treaties of Uruguay
Treaties of Uzbekistan
Treaties of Vanuatu
Treaties of Venezuela
Treaties of Vietnam
Treaties of Yemen
Treaties of Zambia
1984 in New York City
Treaties adopted by United Nations General Assembly resolutions
Treaties extended to Anguilla
Treaties extended to the British Virgin Islands
Treaties extended to the Cayman Islands
Treaties extended to the Falkland Islands
Treaties extended to Gibraltar
Treaties extended to Montserrat
Treaties extended to the Pitcairn Islands
Treaties extended to Saint Helena, Ascension and Tristan da Cunha
Treaties extended to the Turks and Caicos Islands
Treaties extended to the Netherlands Antilles
Treaties extended to Aruba
Treaties extended to the Faroe Islands
Treaties extended to Greenland
Treaties extended to British Hong Kong
Treaties extended to Portuguese Macau
Treaties extended to Bermuda
Treaties extended to Guernsey
Treaties extended to Jersey
Treaties extended to the Isle of Man
Treaties extended to West Berlin